Coquihalla Mountain is an extinct stratovolcano in Similkameen Country, southwestern British Columbia, Canada, located  south of Falls Lake and  west of Tulameen between the Coquihalla and Tulameen rivers.

Geology
Coquihalla Mountain is a major preserved feature in the Miocene age Pemberton Volcanic Belt that was erupting about 21 to 22 million years ago. Like the Pemberton Volcanic Belt, Coquihalla Mountain formed as result of Cascadia subduction.

See also
Jim Kelly Peak
Volcanism of Canada
Volcanism of Western Canada
List of volcanoes in Canada
Garibaldi Volcanic Belt

References

External links

Geology of the Coquihalla Volcanic Complex, southwestern British Columbia

Volcanoes of British Columbia
Two-thousanders of British Columbia
Stratovolcanoes of Canada
Pemberton Volcanic Belt
Subduction volcanoes
Extinct volcanoes
Canadian Cascades
Miocene stratovolcanoes
Polygenetic volcanoes
Yale Division Yale Land District